The Patrouilleurs Outre-mer (POM), or Félix Éboué class, are a type of six high-sea patrol vessels of the French Navy. They are to be based at Nouméa, Tahiti and La Réunion, as replacement for the s which are nearing the end of their career. The POM are far larger, with a 1,300-ton displacement fully loaded, and a wider range or capabilities. They are to be commissioned with the Navy from early 2023 into 2025.

History

Conception 
Work conducted in the framework of the BATSIMAR programme and the 2017 Strategic Study for National Defence and Security determined that protecting French overseas regions required capabilities of opposing terrorist action and threats of encroachment. They defined two families of patrol vessels: new generation high sea patrol vessels (patrouilleurs de haute mer de nouvelle génération, PHM-NG), or Oceanic Patrol Vessel; and Overseas Patrol Vessels (Patrouilleurs Outre-mer, POM). The POM are designed to protect territories and conduct coast guard duties, without significant offensive armament. The Direction générale de l'Armement (DGA) issued an invitation to tender for construction in August 2018.

Order 

On 3 November 2019, during the Assises de l'économie de la mer, President Emmanuel Macron announced that the Ministry of Armed Forces had assigned the contract for building the six POM to Socarenam, of Boulogne-sur-Mer. Socarenam had previously won the tender for building the Patrouilleurs Antilles-Guyane (PAG) of the  type. DGA issued the official order to Socarenam on 24 December 2019.

The order for design, building and maintenance was published on 12 February 2020. It was assigned jointly to Socarenam and CNN-MCO, of Brest, for a total of 223,939,897 Euros excluding VAT.

Construction 
The POM will be named in honour of Free French fighters from the overseas regions where the ships are to be based. The ceremony for the beginning of the construction of the first ship, Auguste Bénébig, took place on 8 October 2020 during a visit of Armed Forces Minister Florence Parly at the Socarenam shipyard in Saint-Malo. The ship was launched on 15 October 2021 at Saint-Malo, and towed to Boulogne-sur-Mer where she arrived on 18 October for her fitting out. She started trials on 26 July 2022, partly from the naval base in Brest. The commissioning is expected for early 2023 after arrival in Nouméa.

Characteristics 
The crew is made up of 30 sailors, but they can accommodate 29 passengers and support combat divers. They are designed to operate in strong heat and high hygrometry during thirty days, with their own craning capabilities. They have two  swift inflatable boats and an Airbus Aliaca unmanned aircraft system (UAS) drone. The drone, capable of up to three-hour missions over a  range, is launched by catapult and recovered automatically via a net. Eleven Aliaca UAS systems are being delivered to the French Navy by 2023 and thirteen more by 2025.

The ships are fitted with a Lyncea combat system made by Nexeya. Surveillance radars are made by Hensoldt.

Ships in class
Six patrol vessels are planned for the French Navy. The first unit began her transit to her base at Nouméa in New Caledonia in January 2023, and she is anticipated to arrive in early April 2023. Another vessel is to be based at Nouméa from 2024. Two further ships will be based at La Réunion, and two more at Tahiti.

See also 
 List of active French Navy ships

Citations

External links 

 .
 .
 .

Patrol boat classes
Patrol vessels of the French Navy